A-scan ultrasound biometry, commonly referred to as an A-scan (short for Amplitude scan), is a routine type of diagnostic test used in optometry or ophthalmology.  The A-scan provides data on the length of the eye, which is a major determinant in common sight disorders.  The most common use of the A-scan is to determine eye length for calculation of intraocular lens power.  Briefly, the total refractive power of the emmetropic eye is approximately 60.  Of this power, the cornea provides roughly 40 diopters, and the crystalline lens 20 diopters.  When a cataract is removed, the lens is replaced by an artificial lens implant.  By measuring both the length of the eye (A-scan) and the power of the cornea (keratometry), a simple formula can be used to calculate the power of the intraocular lens needed.  There are several different formulas that can be used depending on the actual characteristics of the eye.

The other major use of the A-scan is to determine the size and ultrasound characteristics of masses in the eye, in order to determine the type of mass.  This is often termed quantitative A-scan.

Instruments used in this type of test require direct contact with the cornea, however a non-contact instrument has been reported. Disposable covers, which come in actual contact with the eye, have also been evaluated.

See also
 B-scan ultrasonography
 Ultrasonography

References
 Santodomingo-Rubido, J.; Mallen, E.A.H.; Gilmartin, B.; and Wolffsohn, J.S. (2002). A new non-contact optical device for ocular biometry. British Journal of Ophthalmology. 86, 458–462.
 Cass, K.; Thompson, C.M.; Tromans, C.; and Wood, I.C.J. (2002). BALA  Evaluation of the validity and reliability of A-scan ultrasound biometry with a single use disposable cover. British Journal of Ophthalmology. 86, 344–349.

External links
 Medscape: A-scan

Diagnostic ophthalmology
Medical ultrasonography